No. 123 Squadron of the Royal Air Force was a British aircraft squadron in the First and Second World Wars.
It was disbanded for the last time on 20 June 1945.

History

First World War
The squadron was formed at RAF Waddington in Lincolnshire, England on 1 February 1918. On 1 March 1918 it moved to RAF Duxford to begin training as an Airco DH.9 unit using various aircraft. However, it was too late to see action and was disbanded on 17 August 1918.

The squadron was formed again on 20 November 1918 at RAF Upper Heyford as a Canadian-manned unit, again using the DH.9. It moved to Shoreham in March 1919 and was renamed No. 2 Squadron, Canadian Air Force until it was disbanded in 1920.

Second World War

In May 1941 the squadron was formed again at RAF Turnhouse in Scotland with Supermarine Spitfires, assigned to provide escorts and shipping patrols along the Scottish east coast and the Forth Estuary. The squadron was also assigned operational training duty; it took on new pilots and exposed them to operational flying before sending them to squadrons in England.

In April 1942 the squadron personnel, without their aircraft, were shipped to Egypt. They arrived in June, but did not acquire any aircraft until October when Gloster Gladiators were used for training. The squadron was moved to the Persian Gulf and was re-equipped with Hawker Hurricanes, assigned to protect Iranian oilfields against attack. Six months later the squadron moved into the Western Desert of Egypt to undertake convoy patrols, equipped again with Spitfires. It participated in the ground-attack role in Crete as part of Operation Thesis. The squadron did manage to keep hold a number of Hurricanes into 1944 when it was moved again to India in the Chittagong area. It was a busy time for the squadron with ground-attack sorties and bomber escorts and in June 1944 it re-equipped with the American Republic P-47 Thunderbolts, and continued in support of the Army operations and escorting Douglas Dakotas on supply missions behind Japanese lines. On 20 June 1945 the squadron disbanded when it was re-numbered as 81 Squadron.

Aircraft operated

Notes

References

External links

Official squadron history

123
123
Military units and formations established in 1918
Aircraft squadrons of the Royal Air Force in World War II
1918 establishments in the United Kingdom
Military units and formations disestablished in 1945